Events in the year 1481 in Japan.

Incumbents
Monarch: Go-Tsuchimikado

Births
January 15 - Ashikaga Yoshizumi (d. 1511), shōgun

References 

 
 
Japan
Years of the 15th century in Japan